Dennis Iverson (born September 4, 1943) is an American politician and rancher from Whitlash, Montana who served in the Montana House of Representatives from 1979 to 1989, representing Liberty County as a Republican. Iverson served as Speaker pro tempore of the Montana House of Representatives from 1987 to 1989.

References

1943 births
Living people
20th-century American politicians
Republican Party members of the Montana House of Representatives
Ranchers from Montana
People from Liberty County, Montana